The Catalan Labour, Economic and Social Affairs Council (CTESC) is a consultative and advisory body to the Government of Catalonia in socioeconomic, labour and occupational matters. It was created under Law 3/1997, of May 16, and Law 7/2005, of June 8, developed by Decree 43/2007 of February 20 and by the Internal Regulation, which established its new regulatory framework.

Functions 
The main function of the Council is to issue mandatory, non-binding opinions, prior to the corresponding procedure, on the draft bills and draft legislative decrees that regulate socio-economic, labour and employment matters. The council also prepares annual reports reflecting its considerations regarding the socioeconomic and labour situation in Catalonia and the situation of self-employed workers in Catalonia.

Composition 
Article 3 of Law 7/2005, of June 8, of the Catalan Labour, Economic and Social Affairs Council and article 4 of Decree 43/2007, of February 20, on the development of the Law, provide that the Council is composed of thirty-seven members, distributed as follows:

 The person who holds the Presidency.
 The First Group, made up by twelve members, representing the most significant trade union organizations (CCOO and UGT).
 The Second Group, made up by twelve members, representing the most significant employers’ organizations (Foment, Pimec and Fepime).
 The Third Group, made up by twelve members: six representing the agrarian sector, the maritime-fishing sector and the social economy sector, currently represented by the following organizations: Catalonian Farmers Union (Unió de Pagesos de Catalunya, UP), Young Farmers and Cattle Ranchers of Catalonia ( Joves Agricultors i Ramaders de Catalunya, JARC), Catalan National Federation of Fishermen's Associations (FNCP), Confederation of Cooperatives of Catalonia (CCC), Board of Entities of the Third Social Sector of Catalonia, and six others, which have to be respected experts in the subjects belonging to the competence field of the Council.

Organs 
The bodies of the Catalan Labour, Economic and Social Council, in accordance with the provisions of article 6 of Law 7/2005 and article 5 of Decree 43 / 2007, are the following ones:

 The Plenary
 The Executive Commission
 The work commissions
 The Presidency
 The vice presidencies
 The Executive Secretar

Latest publications 

 Opinions 
 Socio-economic and labour memory of Catalonia 
 Situation of autonomous work in Catalonia 
 Management report 
 Families support policies
 Integration of social and health care

References

External links 

 Catalan Observatory of the Corporate Social Responsibility 
 CTESC in Twitter
 Website of the Economic and Social Council of Spain and of the ESC of the autonomous communities
 Economic and Social Council of Spain
 European Economic and Social Committee

Economy of Catalonia
Government of Catalonia